Dark fermentation is the fermentative conversion of organic substrate to biohydrogen. It is a complex process manifested by diverse groups of bacteria, involving a series of biochemical reactions using three steps similar to anaerobic conversion. Dark fermentation differs from photofermentation in that it proceeds without the presence of light.

Overview
Fermentative/hydrolytic microorganisms hydrolyze complex organic polymers to monomers which are further converted to a mixture of lower-molecular-weight organic acids and alcohols by obligatory producing acidogenic bacteria.

Utilization of wastewater as a potential substrate for biohydrogen production has been drawing considerable interest in recent years especially in the dark fermentation process. Industrial wastewater as a fermentative substrate for H2 production addresses most of the criteria required for substrate selection viz., availability, cost and biodegradability. Chemical wastewater (Venkata Mohan, et al., 2007a,b), cattle wastewater (Tang, et al., 2008), dairy process wastewater (Venkata Mohan, et al. 2007c, Rai et al. 2012), starch hydrolysate wastewater (Chen, et al., 2008) and designed synthetic wastewater (Venkata Mohan, et al., 2007a, 2008b) have been reported to produce biohydrogen apart from wastewater treatment from dark fermentation processes using selectively enriched mixed cultures under acidophilic conditions. Various wastewaters viz., paper mill wastewater (Idania, et al., 2005), starch effluent (Zhang, et al., 2003), food processing wastewater (Shin et al., 2004, van Ginkel, et al., 2005), domestic wastewater (Shin, et al., 2004, 2008e), rice winery wastewater (Yu et al., 2002), distillery and molasses based wastewater (Ren, et al., 2007,  Venkata Mohan, et al., 2008a), wheat straw wastes (Fan, et al., 2006) and palm oil mill wastewater (Vijayaraghavan and Ahmed, 2006) have been studied as fermentable substrates for H2 production along with wastewater treatment. Using wastewater as a fermentable substrate facilitates both wastewater treatment apart from H2 production. The efficiency of the dark fermentative H2 production process was found to depend on pre-treatment of the mixed consortia used as a biocatalyst, operating pH, and organic loading rate apart from wastewater characteristics (Venkata Mohan, et al., 2007d, 2008c, d, Vijaya Bhaskar, et al., 2008d).

In spite of its advantages, the main challenge observed with fermentative H2 production processes is the relatively low energy conversion efficiency from the organic source. Typical H2 yields range from 1 to 2 mol of H2/mol of glucose, which results in 80-90% of the initial COD remaining in the wastewater in the form of various volatile organic acids (VFAs) and solvents, such as acetic acid, propionic acid, butyric acid, and ethanol. Even under optimal conditions about 60-70% of the original organic matter remains in solution. Bioaugmentation with selectively enriched acidogenic consortia to enhance H2 production was also reported (Venkata Mohan, et al., 2007b). Generation and accumulation of soluble acid metabolites causes a sharp drop in the system pH and inhibits the H2 production process. Usage of unutilized carbon sources present in acidogenic process for additional biogas production sustains the practical applicability of the process. One way to utilize/recover the remaining organic matter in a usable form is to produce additional H2 by terminal integration of photo-fermentative processes of H2 production (Venkata Mohan, et al. 2008e, Rai et al. 2012) and methane by integrating acidogenic processes to terminal methanogenic processes.

See also
Biogas
Biohydrogen
Biological hydrogen production (algae)
Biomass
Electrohydrogenesis
Fermentation (biochemistry)
Microbial fuel cell

References

Chen, S.-D., Lee, K.-S., Lo, Y.-C., Chen, W.-M., Wu, J.-F., Lin, C.-Y., Chang, J.-S.,2008, "Batch and continuous biohydrogen production from starch hydrolysate by Clostridium species". International Journal of Hydrogen Energy 33, 1803–12
Dabrock, B., Bahl, H., Gottschalk, G., 1992. "Parameters affecting solvent production by Clostridium pasteurianum", Appl Environ Microbiol, 58, 1233-9
Das, D., Veziroglu, T.N., 2001. "Hydrogen production by biological process: a survey of literature". International Journal of Hydrogen Energy 26, 13-28
Das, D., 2008, "International workshop on biohydrogen production technology" (IWBT 2008),7–9 February 2008, IIT Kharapgur. International Journal of Hydrogen Energy 33, 2627-8
Fan, Y.T, Zhang, Y.H., Zhang, S.F., Hou, H-W., Ren, B-Z., 2006. "Efficient conversion of wheat straw wastes into biohydrogen gas by cow dung compost". Biores Technol 97, 500-5
Ferchichi, M., Crabbe, E., Gwang-Hoon, G., Hintz, W., Almadidy, A., 2005. "Influence of initial pH on hydrogen production from cheese whey". J Biotechnol 120, 402-9
Idania, V.V., Richard, S., Derek, R., Noemi, R.S., Hector, M.P.V., 2005. "Hydrogen generation via anaerobic fermentation of paper mill wastes". Biores Technol 96, 1907–13
Kapdan, I. K., Kargi, F., 2006. "Bio-hydrogen production from waste materials", Enzyme Microb Technol 38, 569–82
Kim, J., Park, C., Kim, T-H., Lee, M., Kim, S., Kim, S., Seung-Wook., Lee, J., 2003. "Effects of various pretreatments for enhanced anaerobic digestion with waste activated sludge". J. Biosci. Bioeng 95, 271-5
Kraemer, J.T., Bagley, D.M., 2007. "Improving the yield from fermentative hydrogen production". Biotechnol Let 29, 685–95
Logan, B.E., 2004. Feature article: "Biologically extracting energy from wastewater: Biohydrogen production and microbial fuel cells". Environ Sci Technol 38, 160A-167A
Logan, B.E., Oh, S.E., van Ginkel, S., Kim, I.S., 2002. "Biological hydrogen production measured in batch anaerobic respirometers". Environ Sci Technol 36, 2530-5
Rai, Pankaj K, Singh, S.P  & Asthana, R.K . "Biohydrogen production from cheese whey wastewater in a two-step anaerobic process". Applied Biochemistry and Biotechnology 2012, 167 (6) 1540-9
Ren, N.Q., Chua, H., Chan, S.Y., Tsang, Y.F., Wang, Y.J., Sin, N., 2007. "Assessing optimal fermentation type for bio-hydrogen production in continuous flow acidogenic reactors", Biores Technol 98, 1774–80
Roy Chowdhury, S., Cox, D., Levandowsky, M., 1988. "Production of hydrogen by microbial fermentation". International Journal of Hydrogen Energy 13, 407-10 
Shin, H.S., Youn, J.H., Kim, S.H., 2004. "Hydrogen production from food waste in anaerobic mesophilic and thermophilic acidogenesis". International Journal of Hydrogen Energy 29, 1355–63
Sparling, R., Risbey, D., Poggi-Varaldo, H.M., 1997. "Hydrogen production from inhibited anaerobic composters". International Journal of Hydrogen Energy 22, 563–6
Tang, G.,  Huang, J.,  Sun, Z.,  Tang, Q., Yan, C.,  Liu, G., 2008. "Biohydrogen production from cattle wastewater by enriched anaerobic mixed consortia: Influence of fermentation temperature and pH". J Biosci Bioengng., 106, 80-7
Valdez-Vazquez, I., Rıos-Leal, E., Munoz-Paez, K.M., Carmona-Martınez, A., Poggi-Varaldo, H.M., 2006. "Effect of inhibition treatment, type of Inocula, and incubation temperature on batch H2 production from organic solid waste". Biotechnol Bioeng 95, 342-9
van Ginkel, S.W., Oh, S.E., Logan. B. E., 2005. "Biohydrogen gas production from food processing and domestic wastewaters". International Journal of Hydrogen Energy 30, 1535–42
Venkata Mohan, S., Vijaya Bhaskar, Y., Sarm, P.N., 2007a. "Biohydrogen production from chemical wastewater treatment by selectively enriched anaerobic mixed consortia in biofilm configured reactor operated in periodic discontinuous batch mode". Water Res 41, 2652–64
Venkata Mohan, S., Mohanakrishna G., Veer Raghuvulu S., Sarma, P.N., 2007b. "Enhancing biohydrogen production from chemical wastewater treatment in anaerobic sequencing batch biofilm reactor (AnSBBR) by bioaugmenting with selectively enriched kanamycin resistant anaerobic mixed consortia". International Journal of Hydrogen Energy 32, 3284–92
Venkata Mohan, S., Lalit Babu, V., Sarma, P.N., 2007c. "Anaerobic biohydrogen production from dairy wastewater treatment in sequencing batch reactor (AnSBR): Effect of organic loading rate". Enzyme and Microbial Technology 41(4), 506-15
Venkata Mohan, S., Bhaskar, Y.B., Krishna, T.M., Chandrasekhara Rao N., Lalit Babu V., Sarma, P.N., 2007d. "Biohydrogen production from chemical wastewater as substrate by selectively enriched anaerobic mixed consortia: Influence of fermentation pH and substrate composition". International Journal of Hydrogen Energy, 32, 2286–95
Venkata Mohan, S., Mohanakrishna, G., Ramanaiah, S.V, Sarma, P.N., 2008a. "Simultaneous biohydrogen production and wastewater treatment in biofilm configured anaerobic periodic discontinuous batch reactor using distillery wastewater". International Journal of Hydrogen Energy 33(2), 550-8
Venkata Mohan, S., Mohanakrishna, G., Ramanaiah, S.V, Sarma, P.N., 2008b. "Integration of acidogenic and methanogenic processes for simultaneous production of biohydrogen and methane from wastewater treatment". International Journal of Hydrogen Energy 33, 2156–66
Venkata Mohan, S., Lalit Babu, V., Sarma, P.N., 2008c. "Effect of various pre-treatment methods on anaerobic mixed microflora to enhance biohydrogen production utilizing dairy wastewater as substrate". Biores Technol 99, 59-67
Venkata Mohan, S., Lalit Babu, V., Srikanth, S., Sarma, P.N., 2008d. "Bio-electrochemical behavior of fermentative hydrogen production process with the function of feeding pH". International Journal of Hydrogen Energy 
Venkata Mohan, S., Srikanth, S., Dinakar, P., Sarma, P.N., 2008e. "Photo-biological hydrogen production by the adopted mixed culture: Data enveloping analysis". International Journal of Hydrogen Energy 33(2), 559-69
Venkata Mohan, S., Mohanakrishna,G., Reddy, S.S., Raju, B.D., Rama Rao, K.S., Sarma, P,N., 2008f. "Self-immobilization of acidogenic mixed consortia on mesoporous material (SBA-15) and activated carbon to enhance fermentative hydrogen production". International Journal of Hydrogen Energy  
Vijaya Bhaskar, Y., Venkata Mohan S, Sarma, P.N., 2008. "Effect of substrate loading rate of chemical wastewater on fermentative biohydrogen production in biofilm configured sequencing batch reactor". Biores Technol 99, 6941–8
Vijayaraghavan, K., Ahmad, D., "Biohydrogen generation from palm oil mill effluent using anaerobic contact filter". International Journal of Hydrogen Energy 31, 1284–91
Yu, H., Zhu, Z., Hu, W., Zhang, H., 2002. "Hydrogen production from rice winery wastewater in an upflow anaerobic reactor by using mixed anaerobic cultures", International Journal of Hydrogen Energy 27, 1359–65
Zhang, T., Liu, H., Fang, H.H.P., 2003. "Biohydrogen production from starch in wastewater under thermophilic condition". J Environ Manag 69, 149-56
Zhu, H., Beland, M., 2006, "Evaluation of alternative methods of preparing hydrogen producing seeds from digested wastewater sludge". International Journal of Hydrogen Energy 31, 1980-8

External links
Bio-hydrogen production from wastewater

Biofuels technology
Catalysis
Environmental engineering
Hydrogen biology
Hydrogen production